This is a list of tables showing the historical timeline of the exchange rate for the Indian rupee (INR) against the special drawing rights unit (SDR), United States dollar (USD), pound sterling (GBP), Deutsche mark (DM), euro (EUR) and Japanese yen (JPY).

The US dollar was worth 3 in 1947 not 1, and 69.9 in 2018.

Notes
 The data on exchange rate for Japanese Yen is in per 100 Yen.
 The end year rate for 1998–99 pertain to March 26, 1999 of Deutsche Mark rate.
 Data from 1971 to 1991–92 are based on official exchange rates.
 Data from 1992 to 1993 onward are based on FEDAI (Foreign Exchange Dealers' Association of India) indicative rates.
 Data from 1971 to 1972–73 for the Deutsche Mark and the Japanese Yen are cross rates with the US Dollar.
 The Euro replaced the Deutsche Mark w.e.f. January 1, 1999.

1974 to 2022

References

Coins of India
Currency lists
Foreign exchange market